The men's 57 kg (125.4 lbs) Semi-Contact category at the W.A.K.O. World Championships 2007 in Coimbra was the lightest of the male Semi-Contact tournaments being the equivalent of the featherweight division when compared to Full-Contact's weight classes.  There were eleven men from two continents (Europe and Asia) taking part in the competition.  Each of the matches was three rounds of two minutes each and were fought under Semi-Contact rules.   

As there were too few fighters for a sixteen-man tournament, five of the contestants had byes through to the quarter finals.  The tournament winner was Canada's Robbie Lavoie who defeated Poland's Piotr Bąkowski in the final on points to claim gold.  The two Light-Contact finalists from the earlier Belgrade event, silver medal winner Maxim Aysin from Russia and champion Dezső Debreczeni from Hungary, had to make do with bronze medal finishes.

Results 
These matches were decided on points.

See also 
 List of WAKO Amateur World Championships
 List of WAKO Amateur European Championships
 List of male kickboxers

References

External links 
 WAKO World Association of Kickboxing Organizations Official Site

Kickboxing events at the WAKO World Championships 2007 Coimbra
2007 in kickboxing
Kickboxing in Portugal